Ana Carolina Cosse Garrido (born December 25, 1962) is a Uruguayan engineer and politician of the Broad Front coalition, serving as Intendant of Montevideo since November 27, 2020.

She served as Minister of Industry, Energy and Mining from 2015 to 2019, during the second administration of Tabaré Vázquez. At 2019 Uruguayan general election, she was elected as Senator of Uruguay, assuming at February 15, 2020. On September 27, 2020, she was elected as Intendant of Montevideo, the capital of the country.

Early life and education

She was born in Montevideo, on December 25, 1961, as the daughter of Zulma Garrido and Villanueva Cosse, a history teacher and an actor, respectively. In 1991, Cosse graduated from the Faculty of Engineering of the University of the Republic in Montevideo, with a degree in electrical engineering. In 2009, at the same study center, she obtained a master's degree in Mathematical Engineering.

Political career

Her activity in politics began in 2008, when she assumed the position of director of the Information Technology Division of the Departmental Government of Montevideo. Among the tasks performed in office, the direction of technological implementation of the city's Metropolitan Transportation System (STM) stands out.

In May 2010, President José Mujica appointed her as president of ANTEL (National Administration of Telecommunications), a position she held until 2015. In December 2014, after confirming the election of Tabaré Vázquez for a new presidential term, it was announced that Cosse was going to be the head of the Ministry of Industry, Mining and Energy, position she assumed on March 2, 2015.

2019 Presidential Candidacy 
In 2018, she began to be seen as a possible candidate for the presidency or vice-presidency for the 2019 election. On November 10, 2018, the Plenary of the Broad Front proclaimed Cosse, Daniel Martínez, Óscar Andrade and Mario Bergara as pre-candidates for the 2019 presidential primaries. Of the four pre-candidates for the Presidency of the Republic by the Broad Front for the 2019 primary elections, Cosse obtained 27% of the votes, being the second most voted, after Daniel Martínez.

Intendant of Montevideo 

On January 29, 2020, the Departmental Plenary of the Broad Front in Montevideo proclaimed Cosse, Daniel Martínez and Álvaro Villar as candidate for Intendant of Montevideo for the municipal election of that year. 

On September 27, she was elected Intendant of Montevideo with 20.7% of the votes,  due to the total votes for her party exceeding those of the candidate of the Coalición Multicolor, Laura Raffo. 

Cosse took office on November 27. As of November 2020, Cosse is seen as a presidential hopeful for 2024.

References

External links 

Living people
1962 births
Ministers of Industries, Energy and Mining of Uruguay
Women government ministers of Uruguay
Intendants of Montevideo
Uruguayan people of Italian descent
Uruguayan engineers
Broad Front (Uruguay) politicians
Women mayors of places in Uruguay
Movement of Popular Participation politicians
People from Montevideo